The FIA Motorsport Games is a multi-sport motorsport events of nations administered by the Fédération Internationale de l'Automobile. 

The first event took place in Italy in 2019 and was won by Russia. The 2020 edition was postponed to 2021, and then subsequently to 2022, due to the COVID-19 pandemic. 
The FIA announced that the 2022 event would be hosted in the city of Marseille, and took place on 29–30 October 2022.

Sports

There has been a total of 9 sports, spanning 16 disciplines, included in the Olympic programme at one point or another in the history of the Games.